For Those of You Who Have Never (And Also Those Who Have) is the second studio album from American electronic musician Brian Leeds under the pseudonym Huerco S. and was released by Proibito Records on June 6, 2016. Pitchfork listed the album among their top 50 ambient albums of all time, and top 200 albums of the 2010s.

Production
For Those of You Who Have Never... was produced by Brian Leeds under the pseudonym "Huerco S." in his Brooklyn apartment. The album is a work of ambient music, which was a stylistic departure from his first album, the more rhythmic and techno oriented Colonial Patterns (2013). He decided to stop using external samples as in his earlier work, seeking new ways to express himself.

Track listing

Personnel
 Brian Leeds – Composition and production
 Simon Davey – Mastering
 DJ Python – Liner notes

References

External links

 Proibito Records – Catalog

2016 albums
Ambient albums by American artists